Dejan Brđović (Serbian Cyrillic: Дејан Брђовић, 21 February 1966 – 21 December 2015) was a Serbian volleyball player who competed for Yugoslavia in the 1996 Summer Olympics.

Born in Kraljevo, Serbia, Yugoslavia, in 1996 he was part of the Yugoslav team which won the bronze medal in the Olympic tournament. He played three matches.

References

1966 births
2015 deaths
Serbian men's volleyball players
Serbia and Montenegro men's volleyball players
Yugoslav men's volleyball players
Volleyball players at the 1996 Summer Olympics
Olympic volleyball players of Yugoslavia
Olympic bronze medalists for Federal Republic of Yugoslavia
Olympic medalists in volleyball
Olympiacos S.C. players
Sportspeople from Kraljevo
Medalists at the 1996 Summer Olympics
Serbian expatriate sportspeople in Greece
Expatriate volleyball players in Greece
Serbian expatriate sportspeople in Italy
Expatriate volleyball players in Italy
Serbian expatriate sportspeople in Azerbaijan